Wall game can refer to different games

Eton wall game, famously played only at Eton
The Wall Game, a UK children's game show on ITV during the 1980s
Any game that redefines a wall as part of the board that the game is played on, for example Escape from Colditz